Valley of Death may refer to:

Places
Valley of Death (Bydgoszcz), the site of a 1939 Nazi mass murder and mass grave site in northern Poland
Valley of Death (Crimea), the site of the Charge of the Light Brigade in the 1854 Battle of Balaclava
Valley of Death (Gettysburg), the 1863 Gettysburg Battlefield landform of Plum Run
Valley of Death (Dukla Pass), the site of a tank battle during the Battle of the Dukla Pass in 1944 (World War II)
The Valley of Death, an area of poisonous volcanic gas near the Kikhpinych volcano in Russia
The Valley of Death, an area of poisonous volcanic gas near the Tangkuban Perahu volcano in Indonesia
 Valley of Death, a nickname for the highly polluted city of Cubatão, Brazil

Other uses
 The Valley of Death (audio drama), a Doctor Who audio play
 The Valley of Death (film), a 1968 western film
"Valley of Death", the flawed NewsStand: CNN & Time debut program that caused the Operation Tailwind controversy
 A literary element of "The Charge of the Light Brigade" by Alfred, Lord Tennyson
 A reference to the difficulty of covering negative cash flow in the early stages of a start-up company; see Venture capital
"The Valley of Death", a song by the Swedish heavy metal band Sabaton from the 2022 album The War to End All Wars

See also
 
Death Valley (disambiguation)
Valley of the Shadow of Death (disambiguation)